Silversword (sometimes written Silver Sword ) is a fictional supervillain in the DC Comics universe.  He first appeared in Superboy (vol. 3) #5 (June 1994).

Fictional character biography
Dr. Arnold Kaua is the curator of the Hawaiian Historical Museum, and a proponent of Hawaiian rights. One day he discovers a container with a mysterious alien metal he dubs "animetal." The container explodes, and some of the animetal imbeds itself in Kaua's chest in the shape of a sword. After discovering the animetal gives him superpowers, Kaua takes the name Silversword (from the plant of the same name) and declares himself the true defender of Hawaiian tradition and culture.

After a US Navy vessels uses Kahoolawe Island, a remote and uninhabited part of the Hawaiian Islands, for target practice, Silversword begins attacking Navy ships. Superboy is able to stop Silversword, even though the Boy of Steel is suffering from the clone virus at the time.

Silversword returns in Superboy (vol. 3) #24 (Feb 1996) to face Superboy and his new partner, Knockout. Silversword's reason for attacking is that he disapproves of Knockout's methods of crimefighting. The Navy has also asked Superboy to capture Silversword, as they are interested in the animetal shrapnel in his chest. Silversword is defeated, but Knockout throws him through a Navy helicopter, to prevent him from being treated as a lab animal (as she was on Apokolips).

In Superboy (vol. 3) #45 (Nov 1997), Superboy and the Legion of Super-Heroes face Silversword after he steals the spear of Lono, which is alleged to grant its user great powers. Silversword manages to escape the superheroes by causing the museum to collapse.  

Silversword later takes the spear of Lono to the Kīlauea volcano, in an attempt to find a magical gem left there previously by Superboy. With the two mystical objects, Silversword plans to resurrect the goddess Pele. Superboy manages to defeat Silversword by immersing him in hot lava and then throwing him into the sea, which severely damages his metal body.

Silversword manages to repair the damage to his body, and to contact the goddess Pele. She orders him to kill Superboy. Silversword attacks Superboy and the visiting Green Lantern, and before they can react, seemingly pushes them to their deaths into a volcano.

The two heroes manage to survive, and fly to Hilo to face Silversword and Pele. Pele attacks the two heroes, and nearly succeeds in destroying them. However, her attack also devastates much of the countryside and brings harm to many Hawaiians, which forces Silversword to realize how evil the goddess is. Silversword joins Superboy and Green Lantern and attacks Pele, but is badly damaged by Pele's molten lava attacks. This is his last appearance.

Powers and abilities
The animetal shrapnel in Silversword's chest gives him a number of powers. He can cause the metal to cover his entire body, creating a nearly invulnerable armor plating. Silversword can extrude the metal into shapes, usually blades or knives. The animetal gives Silversword the power of flight and superstrength. When in his superpowered state, Silversword shapes the armor into the form of King Kamehameha, the legendary Hawaiian warrior.

Footnotes

References
Silversword at the Unofficial Guide to the DC Universe

Comics characters introduced in 1994
DC Comics characters with superhuman strength
DC Comics supervillains
Fictional characters from Hawaii
Fictional antiquarians and curators
Fictional swordfighters in comics